Caladenia clavescens is a plant in the orchid family, Orchidaceae and is endemic to central Victoria in Australia. It is a ground orchid with a single hairy leaf and usually a single dark red to maroon flower.

Description
The petals are similar to the sepals but somewhat shorter. Flowering occurs from September to October.

Taxonomy and naming
This orchid was first formally described by David L. Jones in 2006 as Arachnorchis clavescens and the description was published in Australian Orchid Research. The type specimen was collected near Castlemaine. In 2007, Gary Backhouse changed the name to Caladenia clavescens. The specific epithet ("clavescens") is derived from the Latin word clava meaning "club" and the suffix -escens meaning "becoming", referring to the more or less club-like tips of the sepals and petals of many of the specimens of this species.

Distribution and habitat
Caladenia clavescens occurs in central Victoria near the towns Campbells Creek, Castlemaine, Chewton.

Conservation
This spider orchid is listed as "vulnerable" and is protected under the Flora and Fauna Guarantee Act 1988.

References

clavescens
Plants described in 2006
Endemic orchids of Australia
Orchids of Victoria (Australia)
Taxa named by David L. Jones (botanist)